The Komsomolsk–Dezhnyovka railway line is about 363 km of Far Eastern Railway within Russian Railways. It connects Dezhnyovka station of Trans-Siberian Railway near Khabarovsk and Komsomolsk-on-Amur station of Baikal-Amur Mainline. The construction of this line began in 1935, and opened in 1940.

"Yunost" train connects from Khabarovsk to Komsomolsk-on-Amur, and the other train connects Vladivostok - Sovetskaya Gavan.

References

See also
Trans-Siberian Railway
Baikal-Amur Mainline

Railway lines in Russia